The Women's Indoor Pan American Cup is an international women's indoor hockey competition organized by the Pan American Hockey Federation. The winning team becomes the champion of the Americas. The tournament serves as a qualification tournament for the Women's Indoor Hockey World Cup.

The tournament has been won by five different teams: the United States, Argentina and Canada all have won the tournament twice. Trinidad and Tobago and Cuba only have won one title. The most recent edition was held in Spring City, Pennsylvania, United States and was won by the United States.

Results

Successful national teams

* = host nation

Team appearances

See also
Men's Indoor Pan American Cup
Women's Pan American Cup

References

External links
Pan American Hockey Federation

 
Indoor
Recurring sporting events established in 2002
Pan American cup